Donna Norris may refer to:

 Donna Norris (child safety campaigner), mother of Amber Hagerman, namesake of the AMBER Alert
 Donna Norris (baseball) (1934–2013), All-American Girls Professional Baseball League player